Alexander White Walker (15 November 1881 – 12 May 1916) was a Scottish professional footballer who played in the Scottish League for Heart of Midlothian and Motherwell as an inside right. He also played for Brentford in the Southern League.

Personal life 
Walker was the younger brother of fellow Heart of Midlothian footballer, Bobby Walker. He served as a private in the Royal Scots during the First World War and died on 12 May 1916 from tuberculosis. Walker was buried in North Merchiston Cemetery, Edinburgh and his mother and brother were later interred in the same plot.

Career statistics

Honours 
Heart of Midlothian

 Rosebery Charity Cup: 1899–00

References 

1881 births
1916 deaths
19th-century Scottish people
20th-century Scottish people
20th-century deaths from tuberculosis
Scottish footballers
Brentford F.C. players
Association football inside forwards
Southern Football League players
Scottish Football League players
Heart of Midlothian F.C. players
Motherwell F.C. players
British Army personnel of World War I
Royal Scots soldiers
British military personnel killed in World War I
Tuberculosis deaths in Scotland